Chaloner McCrae Humphrey Mannington Caffyn (28 April 1891 – 28 March 1917) was an English professional ice hockey goaltender who played for the English national team.

Personal life
Born in Australia, Caffyn grew up in Portsmouth and was educated at Cheltenham College. He trained as an engineer at the University of Zurich and worked at the Midland Railway Carriage and Wagon Company in Birmingham. On 14 September 1914, a month after the outbreak of the First World War, Caffyn was commissioned into the East Surrey Regiment as a second lieutenant. He served with the regiment on the Western Front for 18 months before being seconded to the Royal Flying Corps. Lieutenant Caffyn was killed on 28 March 1917 flying Nieuport Scout A.6673 when the aircraft's wings collapsed over Avesnes-le-Comte. He was buried at the Avesnes-le-Comte Communal Cemetery Extension. His elder brother Harold had been killed in Hainaut two years earlier.

Career statistics

International career

References

1891 births
1917 deaths
Sportspeople from Sydney
Australian ice hockey goaltenders
Australian emigrants to England
People educated at Cheltenham College
University of Zurich alumni
English engineers
British Army personnel of World War I
East Surrey Regiment officers
Royal Flying Corps officers
British military personnel killed in World War I
Aviators killed in aviation accidents or incidents in France
Victims of aviation accidents or incidents in 1917
20th-century Australian engineers
20th-century British engineers
English ice hockey goaltenders